Pitreavie Amateur Athletic Club, based in Dunfermline, Fife, Scotland,  was formed in 1956. The club makes use of modern and expansive facilities including its own clubhouse and gym as well as access to an outdoor running track and complete indoor facilities at the Pitreavie Indoor Centre run by Fife Sports and Leisure Trust.

Since 1978 the club has had at least one representative at the Commonwealth Games. Possibly the most famous was Linsey MacDonald who competed for Scotland in 1982 and 1986.

At Pitreavie men and women of all ages and abilities compete in a wide range of events, from sprinting to ultra-distance running. The club has teams for all disciplines, as well as highly qualified coaches and excellent facilities. Pitreavie's athletes have competed at all levels, including athletes who have won medals at the Olympic Games.

Famous athletes 

 Linsey MacDonald - (Olympic and Commonwealth relay medalist)
 Ian Mackie - (double.Olympian)
 Trudi Thomson - (world medalist in ultramarathon)
 Eilidh Doyle - (3x European champion and 17-time major medalist)
 Nicole Yeargin - (world, European, Commonwealth relay medalist)

References

External links
 Pitreavie AAC website

Sport in Fife
Dunfermline
1956 establishments in Scotland